Sandra Graf (born 9 December 1969) is a Swiss wheelchair athlete. Graf competes in wheelchair races of a variety of distances.

Life
Graf has twice put her career on hold to have children. In 2003 a lung embolism set back her training and kept her from competing in the marathon and 5,000-meter distances, although she still competed in the 800- and 1,500-meter races.

In 2008, during her first London Marathon wheelchair race, she both won the race over American Amanda McGrory and Briton Shelly Woods and set a new course record of 1:48:04. She has competed in five consecutive Summer Paralympics from 2000 to 2016, and won bronze medals in the marathon in 2008 and 2012.  In 2012, she also won the road time trial H3 cycling event, in which she participated using a handcycle.

References

External links

 

1969 births
Living people
People with paraplegia
Swiss female wheelchair racers
Paralympic wheelchair racers
Paralympic athletes of Switzerland
Paralympic gold medalists for Switzerland
Paralympic bronze medalists for Switzerland
Athletes (track and field) at the 2000 Summer Paralympics
Athletes (track and field) at the 2004 Summer Paralympics
Athletes (track and field) at the 2008 Summer Paralympics
Athletes (track and field) at the 2012 Summer Paralympics
Athletes (track and field) at the 2016 Summer Paralympics
Medalists at the 2008 Summer Paralympics
Medalists at the 2012 Summer Paralympics
Paralympic medalists in athletics (track and field)
20th-century Swiss women
21st-century Swiss women